Luke McFadyen (born 17 November 1982, Melbourne, Brunswick) is an international rugby player.  He was the first Australian-born rugby player to represent Malta Rugby Union at the international level.  He played in 3 test matches (vs. Serbia, Latvia and Luxembourg) to date and 1 European 7's tournament in Lisbon, Portugal (5 7's caps to date).  He played for 2.5 years in England with Luton RFC and Basingstoke RFC.

References
MOC Sports Awards 2003 - Nominees, Maltese Olympic Committee, 8 December 2003
Melbourne High School newsletter, 20 March 2003
MOC Sports Awards 2003, Maltese Olympic Committee

1952 births
Living people
People from Brunswick, Victoria
Rugby union players from Melbourne
Australian expatriate sportspeople in Malta
Australian expatriate sportspeople in England
Australian expatriate rugby union players
Expatriate rugby union players in England
People with acquired Maltese citizenship
Australian rugby union players
People educated at Melbourne High School
Australian people of Maltese descent